Demna (a hypocorism for Demetrius) (born before 1155 - died c. 1178) was a Georgian royal prince and pretender to the throne proclaimed as king during the failed nobles’ revolt of 1177/8.

He was the only son and heir of King David V, who had deposed his father, Demetrius I, in a palace coup in 1155. Shortly after David’s death (1155), Demetrius declared his younger son, George (the future King George III), heir apparent violating thus a principal law of succession and depriving Demna of his rights to the throne.

The medieval Georgian and Armenian chronicles are confused about the circumstances in which David died. According to the medieval Armenian historians, George was somehow implicated in his murder though Georgian sources say nothing about it. An Armenian chronicler, Vardan Araveltsi, says that David was murdered “by Sumbat and Ivane [Orbeli] in a plot of the Orbels... They had made an agreement with Giorgi, Davit’s brother, that he would appoint them generals”. Ivane Orbeli was indeed rewarded by George III with the title of amirspasalar on his coronation. Another Armenian Stepanos Orbelian, a descendant of the Orbeli clan, writing shortly after Vardan, denies any family involvement in the murder of the king and claims George had sworn to his reigning brother that he would rule only until Demna reached his majority, but then reneged on his vow. He claims that the Orbelis had been the witnesses of this vow and that they led the 1177 revolt to restore Demna, who was now adult, to his rightful position. Either way, Demna was considered by many as a lawful pretender to the Georgian crown and victim of injustice. Furthermore, he had married the daughter of Ivane Orbeli and the family’s interest in the revolt was clear. Demna was also sympathized by several high-ranking courtiers and military officers who had their fiefdoms mainly in southern Georgian and Georgian-dominated Armenian lands.

The rebellion led by Ivane Orbeli broke out in 1177. The insurgents crowned Demna the king at the Agara Castle and marched, with 30,000 men, to the Georgian capital of Tbilisi. However, Orbeli’s plan of a surprise attack failed. George III relied mainly on crack troops provided by the Kipchak mercenaries and Caucasian mountaineers. By force and diplomacy, he induced many of the rebel nobles to surrender. Orbeli, however, refused to comply and retired to the Lorhe fortress (now Lori, Armenia). The royal army quickly overran the fiefdoms of rebel lords and put Lorhe under siege. Orbeli requested aid from the neighbouring Seljuk rulers but his forces completely exhausted before the reinforcements could arrive. Demna was the first to surrender. Throwing himself and his followers on the mercy of his uncle, he was blinded and castrated to ensure the primacy of George’s branch of the family, and the Orbelis were extirpated and their lands and wealth seized. Imprisoned, Demna did not survive the punishment and soon died.

The Georgian female poet Tamar Eristavi proposed, in 1988, a romantic though unreliable and otherwise unproved hypothesis identifying Prince Demna with the famous Georgian poet Shota Rustaveli, who was allegedly in love with his cousin, Princess Tamar; he survived the repressions and wrote his poem The Knight in the Panther's Skin (dedicated to Tamar) in exile under the assumed identity of Rustaveli.

References

Lordkipanidze M. Georgian Soviet Encyclopedia, Volume III, Page 461, Tbilisi, 1978

Bagrationi dynasty of the Kingdom of Georgia
Georgian princes
12th-century births
12th-century people from Georgia (country)
1178 deaths
Heirs apparent who never acceded